In organic chemistry, cyclopentanonide is a functional group which is composed of a cyclic ketal of a diol with cyclopentanone. It is seen in amcinonide (triamcinolone acetate cyclopentanonide).

See also
 Acetonide
 Acetophenide
 Acroleinide
 Aminobenzal
 Pentanonide

References

Cyclopentanonides